Frieda River Airport  is an airfield serving the Frieda River area in Papua New Guinea. It is located near the border between the provinces of West Sepik (Sandaun) and East Sepik. The area has a gold and copper mine known as the Frieda River Project.

Facilities 

References

Airports in Papua New Guinea
Sandaun Province
East Sepik Province